Ernest II may refer to:

 Ernest II, Duke of Swabia (died in 1030)
 Ernest II, Duke of Saxe-Gotha-Altenburg (1745–1804)
 Ernest II, Duke of Saxe-Coburg and Gotha (1818–1893)
 Ernest II, Count of Lippe-Biesterfeld (1842–1904)
 Ernst II, Prince of Hohenlohe-Langenburg (1863–1950)
 Ernst II, Duke of Saxe-Altenburg (1871–1955)